Katherine Hine is an American writer, editor, and translator at EditAnything.

She is creator and executive director of Ross County Network for Children, a child advocacy organization. She also has four children.

She was formerly a lawyer in Chillicothe, Ohio and Oklahoma. In 1997, she stopped practicing law after being publicly reprimanded by the Supreme Court of Oklahoma.

Early life and education 
Hine earned a bachelor's degree from Ohio State University in 1966, a J.D. degree from the University of Toledo in 1976, and studied at Victoria University in Wellington, New Zealand during 1982. She has also been known as Katherine Campbell Rohrer and Katherine Hine Green.

Career 
Hine practiced family law in Muskogee, Oklahoma from 1983 until 1996 when she was publicly reprimanded by the Supreme Court of Oklahoma.

In 1994, she was a candidate for district court judge for the 15th Judicial District of Oklahoma, but lost to incumbent Lyle Burris.

Hine was involved in the Oklahoma organization Stop Child Abuse Now (SCAN).

References

Living people
Writers from Columbus, Ohio
Year of birth missing (living people)
Writers from Muskogee, Oklahoma
University of Toledo College of Law alumni
Ohio State University alumni